Vilnius–Kaunas Railway is one of the main local railways in Lithuania. This railway connects Lithuanian capital Vilnius with the 2nd largest city Kaunas.

The railway construction was started in 1859 and finished in 1862.

Incidents 
On 4 April 1975, around 20 people died and at least 80 people were injured in the Žasliai railway disaster. On 6 November 1994, the Bražuolė bridge bombing damaged one of the railway bridges, but derailment of trains was avoided.

Stations 
Vilnius railway station
Paneriai railway station
Lentvaris railway station
Vievis railway station
Žasliai railway station
Kaišiadorys railway station
Pravieniškės railway station
Palemonas railway station
Kaunas railway station

References 

Rail transport in Vilnius
Transport in Kaunas
Railway lines in Lithuania
1520 mm gauge railways in Lithuania
1859 establishments in the Russian Empire